Chester Northgate is a former railway station in Chester, Cheshire, England, that was a terminus for the Cheshire Lines Committee and Great Central Railway.

History

The station, which was located on Victoria Road in the Newtown area of the city, was originally planned by the West Cheshire Railway in 1865. A year later the company was acquired by the  Cheshire Lines Committee. It opened the station on 1 May 1875 for train services to Manchester Central on the Mid-Cheshire Line via Northwich. The CLC track crossed the London, Midland and Scottish Railway and Great Western Railway line over a flying junction at Mickle Trafford.

Chester Northgate had a station building and a covered roof for each platform, it had four tracks with two side platforms, the central tracks being used to store carriages. One of the roofs had been removed by 1966. There were also lower level sidings that contained a locomotive yard.

In 1890 the Manchester, Sheffield and Lincolnshire Railway (renamed Great Central Railway in 1897) completed the  Chester & Connah's Quay Railway to Hawarden Bridge. Services from Chester Northgate ran to Shotton High Level via Blacon and also to Wrexham General and New Brighton, Wirral.

A triangle junction outside the station allowed trains to either terminate at Chester Northgate or pass through the city without stopping. During the Second World War, the station served military personnel that were based at RAF Sealand and at Blacon Camp.

In 1969 a level junction was installed at Mickle Trafford so Manchester trains could be diverted to Chester General. Wrexham & New Brighton services had previously been withdrawn on 9 September 1968.

The station closed on 6 October 1969. The site is now occupied by the Northgate Arena. Some of the original railway station railings can still be seen along the modern shop units on Victoria Road opposite the entrance to the Northgate Arena.

Railway line
Although Chester Northgate closed and the line to the station itself lifted, the line north of the station (avoiding Northgate by the Liverpool Road spur) remained for another 25 years. It was used by the Corus steelmaking plant at Shotton until March 1980. Freight continued to pass north of the former station on a double-tracked line until 20 April 1984. Goods services resumed on a single-track line on 31 August 1986 before final closure in October 1992. The trackbed is now a footpath and cycle way.

Services

References

Bibliography

Further reading

 – photo of station platforms and roof

External links
 history, timetables, maps, tickets and photos
 Images of the line in its final operating days
 Pre-grouping railway - Chester

History of Chester
Cheshire
Former Cheshire Lines Committee stations
Railway stations in Great Britain opened in 1875
Railway stations in Great Britain closed in 1969
Beeching closures in England